Siege of Antioch may refer to:
 Siege of Antioch (253) by the Sassanid Persians
 Siege of Antioch (540) by the Sassanid Persians
 Siege of Antioch (968–969) by the Byzantines
 Siege of Antioch (970–971) by the Fatimids
 Siege of Antioch (1098) by the Crusaders
 Siège d'Antioche, French poem about the siege of 1098
 Siege of Antioch (1268) by the Mamelukes

Sieges of Antioch